Mighty Moshin' Emo Rangers is a television miniseries on MTV UK.  The show was a parody of Mighty Morphin Power Rangers, one that also poked fun at the emo stereotype.  The series was directed by Chris Phillips and Nick Pittom, who both lived in Essex, England. Sound design was by Dominic Sinacola, who lived in Southampton.  The show's theme song was performed by local Essex post-hardcore band Fei Comodo.

Starting out as a fan-film project that was distributed on YouTube, Google Video and Myspace, the show was quickly picked up by MTV UK in 2006, and made its way to the US MTV.

Although a specific release date has yet to be announced, Phillips and Pittom have stated they wish to release a DVD of the show.

Cast

Rangers

 Ross Fretten as Ross, the Introspective White Emo Ranger.  Ross loves tight jeans and his hair.  He is constantly having deep inner thoughts about his own mind and the world around him.  He also likes writing on himself with a permanent marker.  He is generally considered the leader of the Emo Rangers.
 Luke Matthew Markey as Luke, the Chaos Mohawk Red Emo Ranger.  Luke hates the government, capitalism and even his own mother.  Luke has amazing leg strength and uses it when fighting.
 Stef Braithwaite as Stef, the Bleeding Heart Pink Emo Ranger.  Stef was dumped in front of her whole school.  She was left heartbroken, and so she uses her powers to break the hearts of the bad guys.  She loves taking pictures of herself for her MySpace and Facebook accounts.
 John Penn as John, the original Chronic Stoner Green Emo Ranger.  He was able to use his weed smoke blasts to deal powerful and painful blows to enemies.  However, his body begins to reject his preferred drugs, forcing him in season 2 to change his ways.  He becomes the StraightxEdge Blue Emo Ranger, and even gains a special Samurai Mode to his new suit.
 Vicki Godby (née Symes) as Vicken, the Weeping Tears Yellow Emo Ranger.  Vicken loves to write deep meaningful poetry.  She also cries her enemies away with a depressing weeping tear attack.  She is close friends with Stef, and loves teddy bears.
 Fai Burnett (née Archer) as Fai, the FashionxCore Purple Emo Ranger.  Fai is the trendiest kid on the scene.  She appears to be dating Luke.  She comes along to save the day when the Rangers are in trouble, and destroys enemies by giving them a makeover.  This is a nod toward Power Rangers, by introducing a new member into the team when a monster is too strong for them to defeat.  As such, her costume is slightly different.  She also gets a Zord that is different from the Zords piloted by the main team.
 Krystal Moore as Mary Jane Greenfield, a new Chronic Stoner Ranger that joins them in 2015.  After discovering that Happy Valley High is a sham, she rebels and drops out of school to become an Emo Ranger full-time.  She becomes the only remaining Emo Ranger after the principal sends the main team through a time warp to 2025.  She kills the principal to avenge them.

Allies

 Luke Cole as Captain Emohead, a floating emo stereotype head of unknown origin, Captain Emohead is the sassy-mouthed mentor to the Rangers, who gives them their powers and tells them when missions are afoot, and is always enthusiastic about what he is doing (even if he's insulting a Ranger).  This character is a parody of Zordon.
 Uncredited voice talent as Emo 5, An emo-themed robot that hovers around inside of the base, Emo 5 aids the Rangers in getting into the mood to face their next challenge.  This character is a parody of Alpha 5. After not appearing for two episodes, it is revealed in Season 2 that Emo 5 was sold on eBay to pay off the bills Ross had run up calling sex lines.
 Uncredited voice talent as Emo Megazord / Mega Emo Fight Bot: The combined form of each of the Emo Bots.  The original Emo Megazord featured a large guitar as a weapon, and was seen able to combine the FashionxCore EmoZord to become the Fashionable Emo Megazord.  In season 2, Emo Megazord was upgraded to the more powerful Mega Emo Fight Bot.  The FashionxCore EmoZord was likewise upgraded to the FashionxCore Emo Fight Bot.  However, the upgrades took away Mega and FashionxCore's ability to combine with each other to form a merged robotic form.
 Uncredited as Burp and Scott, Bullies at the high school the Emo Rangers attend.  Burp is an average man with a fat stomach.  His partner Scott is a skinny teenager from Scotland because of his name.  They are a parody of Bulk and Skull.
 Uncredited as Lieutenant Stone Age, a caveman who dresses like his MMPR counterpart, Lieutenant Stone.

Villains

 Kathryn Alder (suit actress) and Laura Bradley (voice) as the Evil Empress, a goth-themed space alien villain who lands on the moon and immediately decides to unleash her monsters on Chelmsford, England.  This provokes Captain Emohead to recruit the Emo Rangers to stop her.  Her character is based around Rita Repulsa.  When she speaks, her voice doesn't match up - similarly to what Rita was known for.  Oddly, she apparently gives up after episode three of season 2, as all proceeding monsters are independent and she is never mentioned again.
 Yurek Hanson as the Evil Principal, an evil alien who takes over Happy Valley High School some time before 2015 and becomes the rules-obsessed principal.  He is secretly looking for excuses to use altered prescription drugs to turn the students into his own Hoodie Patrol minions.  When he and Mary Jane rub each other the wrong way, his over-the-top antics cue her in that he's not quite human.  This causes her to rebel against him, and go down the path that leads to her becoming the new Chronic Stoner Ranger.
 Chase Peel and Kyle Johnson (along with various uncredited extras) as the Hoodie Patrol, hypnotized teens in hoodie shirts sent to wreak havoc and do the bidding of whoever is controlling them.  They are frequently employed as foot soldiers to terrorize the Emo Rangers with.  Based on the Putty Patrol from Power Rangers, they are slightly more effective at their jobs than their source inspiration.  They get metallic masks in the 2015 special, to make them seem less human.
 Chris Phillips (via voice distortion software) as the voice of Colonel Crusher and various other monsters.  Crusher, in spite being a colonel in rank, acts as the general for the Empress' army.  He is the first monster she sends to go giant-size and threaten Chelmsford.  He is defeated by the Emo Megazord.  He is believed to be inspired by Goldar.
 Tanda Mutero as Sold Ya Boy / Sold Ya' Kid: A rapper who opposes all things emo.  He teamed up with the Evil Empress to trick teenagers into paying for his bad music using their parents' credit cards - which somehow allowed him to hypnotize them into becoming the Empress' minions.  He controlled this army of teens as his hoodie-less version of the Hoodie Patrol, and even sent them to attack Ross.  When Ross morphed and beat them back, even posing a credible threat to the rapper himself, the rapper summoned an evil robot doppelganger of Avril Lavigne to attack Ross.  The other Rangers show up to save Ross, and the rapper merges by way of the Empress' magic with the Avril robot.  They become the Pop/Rap Collaboration Monster, but are quickly defeated by the Emo Blaster.
 Georgina Fox as Avril Bot, an android under the control of the Evil Empress made to look identical to the famous pop singer.  Robo-Avril was able to out-fight Ross using her guitar, before being fused with Sold Ya' to become the Pop/Rap Collaboration Monster.  Ross salvaged her body after the fight, and reactivated her as a sex slave.

Uncredited / unknown actor and / or voice role villains

 "Santa": The main antagonist of the Christmas special.  A show host - suddenly transformed out of nowhere while under the Empress' control - created a device that turned a mall Santa evil.  Said mall Santa then piloted a colossal Santa-themed robot to destroy Chelmsford.  The special device made Santa's robot super powerful, to the point where it was able to take out both the Emo Megazord and the FashionxCore Emozord.  The day was only saved when Panic! at the Disco destroyed the device, weakening the robot and giving the Rangers a chance to fuse their Zords and destroy it.
 Funky Monkey: A gorilla monster created by the Empress.  Funky Monkey used a special eye beam to hypnotize teenagers into becoming the Hoodie Patrol.  He wasn't a very powerful opponent, as he was defeated single-handedly by Ross.
 Unnamed Giant Robot: A colossal robot that completely owned the Rangers.  The robot also disintegrated Luke's emo hair after releasing a fire blast.  The metal monstrosity was so powerful, Captain Emohead had to recruit Fai into the Emo Rangers to save the city.
 Evil Chronic Stoner Ranger: The former identity of John, abandoned when he decided to give up drugs.  The Empress made an evil clone of John, and copied the powers to bring John's old persona back to life.  The Evil Chronic Stoner Ranger was able to summon vines of marijuana to ensnare his opponents, as well as use an updated version of John's old Bong Emo Zord.  He was able to hold his own in battle with it against John's equally-powerful new StraightxEdge Samurai Emo Fight Bot.  Fearing John would lose, Emohead allowed the other Rangers to intervene.  They formed the newly dubbed "Mega Emo Fight Bot," and prepared to battle John's evil clone.  However, the clone got the munchies mid-battle, and the Rangers used that as an opportunity to destroy the Bong Zord.  The clone returned in disgrace to the Empress, and was never seen again.
 Evil Teddy Bears: An army of teddy bears, created after the Evil Empress noticed how much Vicken loved them.  They were led by Vicken's own favorite teddy, Mr. Fluffy.  They eventually constructed a giant robot, though it was defeated by the Mega Emo Fight Bot.
 Pop/Rap Collaboration Monster: A robotic monster created from the fusion of Sold Ya' and Avril Bot.  It wasn't big enough for the Emo Fight Bots, so the Rangers destroyed it by combining their weapons together.
 New Rave Pirates: Space pirates who came to Earth to introduce a new genre of music called "New Rave" to distract the humans while they stuck rods of nuclear energy up their butts. After seeing how ridiculous New Rave fans looked, Luke figures aliens had to be involved.  They piloted a giant New Rave Robot.  They may have possibly been a reference to Divatox from Power Rangers Turbo.
 Burger Clown: An evil clown of unknown origin who runs a chain of Burger Clown restaurants.  His evil plan is to take whiny emo kids and mince them up into ultra-fattening and addictive burgers.  He somehow replaced the Evil Empress as the commander of the Hoodie Patrol.  He also had three giant robots in the forms of a milkshake, a burger, and a pack of fries. Captain Emohead describes eating his burgers as tasting "like someone crapping in your mouth."
 Uncle Kuddles: A mysterious pedophile somehow became a monster with a parasitic twin brother attached to his back that looked like a small emo boy.  The pedo monster used his ability to puppeteer the parasitic twin as a way to lure in emo teen girls as victims, so that the main monster could molest and kill (and possibly eat?) the victims.  Stef, falling for the ruse through online dating at first, nearly becomes Kuddles' next victim.  However, she comes to her senses in time and fights back.  The other Rangers are summoned, and they use their blaster's "special anti-pedophile setting" to wipe out Kuddles.  Emohead jokes about whether or not he should contact the police, given they'd "just killed a pedophile."

Other / notes

Paul Garson was also to feature as a new Ranger named Paul, though this did not pan out.  Instead, Krystal Moore replaced him as Mary Jane - the Neo-Chronic Stoner Ranger.

Episodes

Season 1

Season 2

2015 Special

A final film was made as a series finale in 2015, when it became obvious that there would be no feasible way to bring the cast in long-term to make more episodes nor the feature-length film they initially planned to make.  On 20 June 2014 the Emo Rangers Facebook Page announced that they wanted to film a movie using a $5,000,000 budget at Shepperton Studios.  No further information was released about that film as of July 2015.  The 31 October 2015 release of the anniversary special suggests that MTV dropped Emo Rangers, forcing the cast and crew to improvise on a much smaller budget.

Development

Inspiration

The creators have given two versions for how the idea of the show came about.

1) One story suggests that in November 2004, Chris was upset due to a breakup with his girlfriend. His friend Nick told him to "Quit being emo, you Emo Ranger!" to which Chris replied with "You Mighty Moshin' Emo Rangers!"

2) Another version comes from an interview with Chris:

"I was sitting at my computer chatting to a friend, Pat. Pat sent me a picture of him dressed as a ninja leaping across a recording studio, and I said 'you look like an emo ranger'. I sat there for a few minutes and thought 'that sounds kind of funny' and then just heard in my head the term 'Mighty Moshin' Emo Ranger'. The more I thought about the name the more I was convinced there should be a show called Mighty Moshin' Emo Rangers, but there wasn't, which was annoying, 'cos I wanted to watch it."

However the story came about, using a Sony HDR-HC1 camcorder, Chris and Nick (who work as professional video editors) decided to film a low-budget Power Rangers parody based on the idea.

Filming locations

Mighty Moshin' Emo Rangers was filmed in the same town as the one the producers and actors reside in, Chelmsford. The actual locations are as follows:

 Moulsham Street: Colonel Crusher's grand entrance clearly happens near the street's iconic sign.
 Central Park: This is where most of the main battle takes place in the original short film, when the Emo Rangers face off against the Hoodie Patrol for the first time.  Additionally, the scenes where Funky Monkey attacks an amusement park were filmed in Central Park while a traveling circus visited the town.
 Oaklands Park: Once an explosion has taken place, you can see people being blasted over the fence away from the explosion.
 High Street
 Baddow Road

Season delays in release

Emo Rangers had become infamous for its long-awaited second season, which was announced back around 2006.  The production was halted for unknown reasons.  This led to many pranksters pretending to have the second season up, but these turned out to be Rick Rolls.

Season 2 finally premiered for real on 12 July 2010, about four years after being announced.  The first episode, "Weed Better Sober Up" parodied the "Return of the Green Ranger" saga from Power Rangers, using the StraightxEdge Ranger as a parody of the Mighty Morphin' White Ranger.  The new season has vastly-improved effects, and had six proper episodes as opposed to three.  The episodes were also mostly standalone, rather than being like the first season's three episodes and short film.  Those were constantly remixed into other episodes, whereas season 2 had some consistency to its edits - further giving the illusion of a proper TV show.  Each episode focused on a particular Ranger, usually involving a single fight before the entire team showed up.

MTV broadcast

In September 2006, MTV broadcast five episodes and a Christmas Special on MTV UK's MTV2 channel. These episodes were show at 8:30 PM GMT Monday through Thursday.  The second season was later broadcast beginning in July–August 2010, with episodes released for broadcast each one day after their equivalents were released on YouTube by the official Emo Rangers Channel.

Mighty Moshin' Emo Rangers: The Video Game

Storm Video Games released an Emo Rangers Flash video game, also commonly titled Go Go Emo Rangers, with permission from Chris and Nick.  The game closely mimics the plot to the original 2005 short film.  It was published across several online gaming websites across the web, including Newgrounds.

References

External links
 EmoRangers.com

MTV original programming
2003 British television series debuts
2005 British television series endings
British parody television series
Power Rangers